USS H-3 (SS-30) was a H-class submarine originally named Garfish, the only ship of the United States Navy named for the gar, a popular target for recreational anglers.

Garfish was laid down by The Moran Company in Seattle, Washington.
She was renamed H-3 on 17 November 1911, launched on 3 July 1913 sponsored by Ms. Helen MacEwan, and commissioned at Puget Sound on 16 January 1914, Lieutenant, junior grade William R. Munroe in command.

Service history

H-3 ran aground in heavy fog while attempting to enter Humboldt Bay on the morning of 16 December 1916. The crew were rescued by Coast Guard Humboldt Bay Life-Saving Station; many were brought to shore by breeches buoy. Storm surf pushed H-3 high up on a sandy beach, surrounded by quicksand. The submarine crew pitched camp on the Samoa, California beach near their stranded submarine, while the tug  steamed from Mare Island Navy Yard to attempt salvage. Only two bids were received. The largest marine salvage firm on the west coast offered to pull the submarine into deep water offshore for $150,000 and the Mercer-Fraser Company of Eureka offered to pull the submarine over the Samoa peninsula into Humboldt Bay for $18,000. 

Navy officials at Mare Island regarded the lumber company proposal as infeasible and felt the salvage firm bid was excessive. The protected cruiser  sailed from Mare Island to tow H-3 off the beach. Milwaukee grounded attempting salvage on 13 January 1917 and broke up in the pounding surf.

H-3 was temporarily decommissioned on 4 February while the lumber company salvage bid was accepted. H-3 was placed on giant log rollers and taken overland to be relaunched into Humboldt Bay on 20 April.

She then returned to San Pedro, California, where she served as flagship of Submarine Division 7 (SubDiv 7), participating in exercises and operations along the coast until 1922. H-3, with the entire division, sailed from San Pedro on 25 July and reached Hampton Roads on 14 September.

H-3 decommissioned at Hampton Roads on 23 October. She was struck from the Naval Vessel Register on 18 December 1930 and scrapped on 14 September 1931.

References

External links
 
  Photos and description of salvaging the sub from the U.S. Navy military archives
 [https://books.google.com/books?id=PG_mAAAAMAAJ&pg=PA396 Salvaging the Submarine H-3''] International Marine Engineering'', September 1917, technical article on bids and work.

United States H-class submarines
World War I submarines of the United States
Maritime incidents in 1916
United States submarine accidents
History of Humboldt County, California
Ships built in Seattle
1913 ships